The Weyenberg Shoe Factory is located in Beaver Dam, Wisconsin.

History
The building originally served as a factory and a warehouse for the Weyenberg Shoe Company. Eventually, the company became the Weyco Group, and has gone on to produce brands including Florsheim Shoes. The building was used for its original purpose until 1994. Since then, it has been converted into an apartment building.

It was added to the State and the National Register of Historic Places in 2000.

References

Industrial buildings and structures on the National Register of Historic Places in Wisconsin
Warehouses on the National Register of Historic Places
Residential buildings on the National Register of Historic Places in Wisconsin
National Register of Historic Places in Dodge County, Wisconsin
Late 19th and Early 20th Century American Movements architecture
Brick buildings and structures
Industrial buildings completed in 1919
Shoe factories
Beaver Dam, Wisconsin